The Italian Buddhist Union (UBI) is an association representing Buddhism in Italy.

The UBI was founded in 1985 in Milan and functions as the Italian member of the European Buddhist Union.

In 2007 the association, which represents a large chunk of Italy's 160,000 Buddhists, signed an agreement with the Italian government, in accordance with article 8 of the Italian Constitution (which regulates the relations with religious minorities), and the agreement became law in 2012.

See also
Buddhism in Italy
Ensoji il Cerchio
Santacittarama

References

External links
Official website

Buddhist organisations based in Italy
1985 establishments in Italy
Religious organizations established in 1985